Ascot Racecourse is a racecourse in Ascot, Berkshire, United Kingdom.

Ascot Racecourse may also refer to:

 Ascot Racecourse Heliport, Ascot, Berkshire
 Ascot Racecourse (Western Australia)
 Ascot Racecourse, Sydney
 Doomben Racecourse and Eagle Farm Racecourse in the Brisbane suburb of Ascot

See also
 Ascot Park (disambiguation)